Part Time (stylized as PARTIME) was a North American pop band that was fronted by California-based musician David Loca (also credited as David Speck). Loca produced and wrote virtually all of the band's output, with most of their studio recordings created alone at his home. AllMusic critic Tim Sendra described the music as "equal parts psychedelic pop, soft rock, and primitive synth pop."

History

Part Time was named so because it began as a solo sideproject of Loca's, who had been performing with groups from Texas and Oklahoma. Loca produced and wrote all the output, with the exception of some material enlisting bandmates and friends. He is originally from Florida, later moving to El Paso, Texas, and started his first band at the age 17. The first Part Time recordings were made in the late 1990s and early 2000s, and were first issued on a label in 2011. Albums until Spell #6 (2018) were recorded almost entirely by himself at his home.

On July 21, 2020, Mexican Summer removed Part Time merchandise from their website and submitted takedown requests for the albums What Would You Say? and PDA on streaming services following the appearance of domestic abuse and sexual misconduct allegations against Loca and other artists affiliated with Burger Records. On July 28, Loca issued a statement that said, in part, that he would "personally see to it that all of my music including myself be removed from all websites, online platforms and any and all music communities/scenes at this time."

Members 

As of 2013:

 David Loca
 Wally Byers
 Robert Dozal
 Billy Trujillo
 Tony Leal

Discography
What Would You Say? (2011)
Saturday Night (2012)
PDA (2013)
Late Night with David Loca (2014)
Virgo's Maze (2015)
Return to Cherry (2015)
Spell #6 (2018)
Modern History (2019)

References

External links
 
 
 
 
 

Lo-fi music groups
2020 disestablishments in California

Musical groups disestablished in 2020